The Advertising Association (AA) is a trade association representing advertisers, agencies, media and research services in the UK advertising industry. Its stated aim is to promote the “…role, rights and responsibilities of advertising and its impact on individuals, the economy and society". Its Chief Executive is Stephen Woodford.

The organisation represents the advertising industry to the UK government, policy-makers and opinion-formers, presenting evidence-based information to influence government decision-making. It references the work of the advertising industry’s think tank, Credos, which produces research reports on UK advertising industry issues.

According to the Marketing Agencies Association (MAA), the Advertising Association is 'the only body that speaks for all sides of [the industry]'.

In January 2019 the AA announced that UK ad spend in 2018 had risen 6.0% year-on-year, to £23.6bn.

History 
In 1924, the Associated Advertising Clubs of the World staged the International Advertising Convention at Wembley. The British section of the exhibition was known as District 14 (with the other 13 in the USA). Two years later, District 14 was converted into the body now known as the Advertising Association.

Membership 
The Advertising Association’s membership comprises around 30 organisations, including technology and media companies as well as other industry associations for advertising, marketing and media.

Operations 
The CEO of the Advertising Association is Stephen Woodford. Its chair is Annette King and its president is Alessandra Bellini. Previous chairs and presidents have included Dame Cilla Snowball, Andy Duncan, Gavin Patterson, James Murphy and Jeremy Bullmore.

The Advertising Association’s board contains members from other related bodies, such as the Institute of Practitioners in Advertising (IPA), the Incorporated Society of British Advertisers (ISBA), ITV, Google and the News Media Association (NMA).

The Advertising Association’s council comprises several large advertisers who work with the AA on major policy initiatives, such as its campaign to increase public trust in advertising.

Advertising Association Council 
The Advertising Association Council consists of agencies, brands and media. It has two roles, one regulatory, one industry-facing. On behalf of industry, Council guides the development of the self-regulatory system and sets advertising policy. The Committee of Advertising Practice (CAP) and the Broadcast Committee of Advertising Practice (BCAP), write the advertising codes and the Advertising Standards Authority (ASA) independently enforces them across all media. The position Council takes guides the Advertising Association’s work: its research, its response to key issues, its advocacy and its public and industry-facing stance. The Council meets three times a year.

LEAD 
The Advertising Association holds an annual industry summit each January which is called LEAD. The conference brings together politicians with representatives from different parts of the advertising industry. The Association also organises training for industry professionals, such as the Media Business Course.

Publications 
In the 1980s and 1990s, the Advertising Association produced a series of essays entitled “Advertising’s Big Questions”. In 2016, various authors were asked to write essays on similar themes, in order to gauge how the industry had changed. Jeremy Bullmore wrote an essay in both eras on “What Is Advertising?”

Related associations

Front Foot
In 2010, the Advertising Association set up Front Foot, a members’ network for the advertising industry. It includes advertisers, agencies and technology companies. It aims to convey a uniform industry view that is “…authoritative, evidence-based and progressive".

business4Life

Founded by the Advertising Association, business4Life is a coalition of companies actively using marketing and communications skills to help deliver Department of Health Change4Life.

Food Advertising Unit

The Food Advertising Unit (FAU) aims to raise the quality of the debate surrounding advertising to children by providing pan-industry leadership and a forum for dialogue to inform industry awareness and best practice in food advertising and marketing communications.

FAU membership is composed of multinational food companies, agencies and the media.

Credos

In 2010, the Advertising Association formed Credos, an advertising think-tank which aims to demonstrate the value of advertising for the UK economy and society.

It produces the Advertising Pays series of reports, which seek to quantify the contribution of the advertising industry to the UK economy, culture, employment and society.

The first report, published in 2013, estimated that every £1 of expenditure on advertising generates £6 for the economy, and that UK advertising contributed £100 billion to UK GDP.  That latter figure had been revised to £120 billion by 2016, due to an increase in advertising expenditure.

Advertising Pays 4, published in 2016, focused on the export value and global impact of UK advertising. It revealed that the UK’s balance of payments for advertising-related services is £1.6 billion, second only to the United States in the world and five times the second highest in Europe, France.

Advertising Pays 7, published in 2019, looked at the role of digital technology in UK advertising. The report forecast online advertising expenditure would account for more than three fifths of total UK advertising expenditure by 2020.

A 2014 Credos report on diversity in advertising revealed that BAME (black, Asian and minority ethnic) respondents were less likely than white respondents to believe that advertising accurately reflects the UK’s multicultural society. BAME's tended to argue that the advertising industry should do more to portray them in a more realistic way.

Policy areas 
In 2018, the Advertising Association set up the Trust Working Group to assess and counter the decline in the public’s trust in advertising. It brings together advertisers, agencies, media owners, tech platforms, as well as fellow trade associations ISBA and IPA. Its research suggests that only 25% of the UK public had a favourable attitude towards advertising, a record low. The Advertising Association report set out specific actions needed to boost trust, such as stopping excessive advertising and retargeting, and ensuring that data privacy is safeguarded.
The Advertising Association has provided evidence in support of maintaining and not extending current restrictions on advertising of foods high in fat, salt and sugar (HFSS), Citing its own research, the Association found that children’s exposure to such advertising has already reduced substantially in recent years. It has also supported the creation of a media campaign to promote responsible gambling.

In 2018, the Advertising Association partnered with the National Advertising Benevolent Society (NABS) and Women in Advertising and Communications, London (WACL) to establish the timeTo initiative, addressing the issue of sexual harassment within the industry.

On Brexit, the Advertising Association believes the industry may be adversely affected if non-British workers leave the country. It has demanded more clarity with regard to access to talent, cross-border data flows, and freedom to advertise on cross-border television channels.

Alongside the DIT and the IPA, the Advertising Association runs an annual Export Month, promoting the UK advertising industry to international audiences.

References

Trade associations based in the United Kingdom
Advertising trade associations
Advertising in the United Kingdom